Lake Emily is a lake in Le Sueur County, Minnesota, United States.

References

Lakes of Le Sueur County, Minnesota
Lakes of Minnesota